Events from the year 1657 in Sweden

Incumbents
 Monarch – Charles X Gustav

Events

 June 1 – Dano-Swedish War (1657–1658): King Frederick III of Denmark signs a manifesto de facto declaring war on Sweden.
 8 July - Battle of Walk
 17 August - Battle of Dirschau
 The Stockholms Banco is founded.

Births

 - Ebba Maria De la Gardie, poet and singer   (died 1697)

Deaths

 7 September - Arvid Wittenberg, count, field marshal and privy councillor  (born 1606) 
 Gustav Horn, Count of Pori, politician   (born 1592) 
 Anders Eriksson Hästehufvud, officer  (born 1577) 
 5 December - Johan Oxenstierna, politician  (born 1611) 
 Stormor i Dalom, vicars wife and local profile  (born 1594)

References

 
Years of the 17th century in Sweden
Sweden